Jon Dumbauld (born February 14, 1963) is a former American football defensive end. He played for the New Orleans Saints in 1986 and 1988 and for the Philadelphia Eagles from 1987 to 1988.

References

1963 births
Living people
American football defensive ends
Kentucky Wildcats football players
New Orleans Saints players
Philadelphia Eagles players